The Office of Liquor and Gaming Regulation is an agency of the Queensland Government's Department of Justice and Attorney-General responsible for regulating the liquor, gaming and adult entertainment industries in Queensland.

The Minister responsible for Liquor and Gaming in the Queensland Parliament is the Honourable Yvette D'Ath MP, Minister for Justice and Attorney-General.

See also

Alcohol in Australia
Gambling in Australia
List of Queensland Government departments

Notes

External links 
 

Government agencies of Queensland